The Wombats is a self-titled EP by The Wombats, released April 8, 2008. Distributed by KIDS in America and Bright Antenna. The EP was the first release by the band in the United States.

Track listing

References

2008 EPs